Stefano Zuccherini (15 July 1953 – 31 March 2021) was an Italian politician who served as a Senator.

References

1953 births
2021 deaths
Italian politicians
Senators of Legislature XV of Italy